The 1982 United States House of Representatives elections was an election for the United States House of Representatives held on November 2, 1982, to elect members to serve in the 98th United States Congress. They occurred in the middle of President Ronald Reagan's first term, whose popularity was sinking due to economic conditions under the 1982 recession. The President's Republican Party lost seats in the House, which could be viewed as a response to the President's approval at the time.  Unlike most midterm election cycles, the number of seats lost—26 seats to the Democratic Party—was a comparatively large swap. It included most of the seats that had been gained the previous election, cementing the Democratic majority. Coincidentally, the number of seats the Democrats picked up (26), was the exact amount the Republicans would have needed to win the House majority. It was the first election held after the 1980 United States redistricting cycle.

In the previous election of 1980 Republicans gained many seats as the result of President Ronald Reagan's coattails. 12 of those officials were gone by 1982.

To date, this election marks the last time the Democrats picked up a House seat in West Virginia.

Overall results

Retiring incumbents
Thirty-nine representatives retired. Thirty-one of those seats were held by the same party, eight seats changed party.

Democrats 
Eighteen Democrats retired. Eleven of those seats were held by Democrats, four were won by Republicans, and three seats were eliminated in redistricting.

Democratic held 
 : John L. Burton, was succeeded by Barbara Boxer (with district being renumbered as California 6).
 : Ronald 'Bo' Ginn, to run for Governor of Georgia, was succeeded by Lindsay Thomas.
 : William M. Brodhead, was succeeded by Sander Levin.
 : Richard Bolling, was succeeded by Alan Wheat.
 : Shirley Chisholm, was succeeded by Major Owens.
 : Lawrence H. Fountain, was succeeded by Tim Valentine.
 : Kenneth Lamar Holland, was succeeded by John Spratt.
 : Jim Mattox, to run for Attorney General of Texas, was succeeded by John Wiley Bryant.
 : Richard C. White, was succeeded by Ronald D. Coleman.
 : Bob Mollohan, was succeeded by Alan Mollohan.
 : Henry Reuss, was succeeded by Jim Moody.

Republican gain 
 : Toby Moffett, to run for U.S. senator, was succeeded by Nancy Johnson.
 : David R. Bowen, was succeeded by Webb Franklin.
 : James David Santini, to run for U.S. senator, was succeeded by Barbara Vucanovich (with district being renumbered as Nevada 2).
 : Allen E. Ertel, to run for Governor of Pennsylvania, was succeeded by George Gekas.

Seat eliminated in redistricting 
 : Floyd Fithian who ran for U.S. senator.
 : James J. Blanchard who ran for Governor of Michigan.
 : Jonathan Brewster Bingham.

Republicans 
Twenty-one Republicans retired. Eleven of those seats were held by Republicans, four were won by Democrats, and six seats were eliminated in redistricting.

Republican held 
 : John Jacob Rhodes, was succeeded by John McCain.
 : Pete McCloskey, to run for U.S. senator, was succeeded by Ed Zschau.
 : Clair Burgener, was succeeded by Ron Packard.
 : Louis A. Bafalis, to run for Governor of Florida, was succeeded by Tom Lewis (with district being renumbered as Florida 12).
 : David F. Emery, to run for U.S. senator, was succeeded by John R. McKernan Jr..
 : Donald J. Mitchell, was succeeded by Sherwood Boehlert (with district being renumbered as New York 25).
 : Bud Brown, to run for Governor of Ohio, was succeeded by Mike DeWine.
 : Marc L. Marks, was succeeded by Tom Ridge (with district being renumbered as Pennsylvania 21).
 : Robin Beard, to run for U.S. senator, was succeeded by Don Sundquist (with district being renumbered as Tennessee 7).
 : James M. Collins, to run for U.S. senator, was succeeded by Steve Bartlett.
 : Paul S. Trible Jr., to run for U.S. senator, was succeeded by Herbert H. Bateman.

Democratic gain 
 : Bob Dornan, to run for U.S. senator, was succeeded by Mel Levine.
 : James Edmund Jeffries, was succeeded by Jim Slattery.
 : Cleve Benedict, to run for U.S. senator, was succeeded by Harley O. Staggers Jr..
 : M. Caldwell Butler, was succeeded by Jim Olin.

Seat eliminated in redistricting 
 : Barry Goldwater Jr., who ran for U.S. senator.
 : Robert McClory.
 : Millicent Fenwick, who ran for U.S. senator.
 : Gregory W. Carman.
 : J. William Stanton.
 : Jean Spencer Ashbrook.

Defeated incumbents 
As a result of redistricting, many incumbents were forced to compete against each other in the same district, which resulted in a larger number of incumbents being defeated in primaries.

In primary elections 
Ten representatives lost renomination: Six lost in redistricting battles pitting incumbents against each other, and four lost nomination to non-incumbent challengers.

Democrats 
Six Democrats lost renomination: three in redistricting races and three to a non-incumbent challenger. All the seats were held by Democrats.

 : Billy Lee Evans lost to challenger J. Roy Rowland.
 : John G. Fary lost to challenger Bill Lipinski.
 : David W. Evans lost a redistricting race to fellow incumbent Andrew Jacobs Jr..
 : Ronald M. Mottl lost to challenger Ed Feighan.
 : Joseph F. Smith lost a redistricting race to fellow incumbent Thomas M. Foglietta.
 : Donald A. Bailey lost a redistricting race to fellow incumbent John Murtha.

Republicans 
Four Republicans lost renomination: three in redistricting races and one to a non-incumbent challenger.

Seat held by a Republican 
These primary winners later won the general election.

 : Wayne R. Grisham lost a redistricting race to fellow incumbent David Dreier.
 : Ed Derwinski lost a redistricting race to fellow incumbent George M. O'Brien.
 : Gary A. Lee lost a redistricting race to fellow incumbent George C. Wortley.

Seat lost to a Democrat 
 : Tom Railsback lost to challenger Kenneth G. McMillan, who later lost the general election to Lane Evans.

In the general election

Democrats 
Three incumbent Democrats lost re-election; two lost to Republican incumbents and one to a non-incumbent challenger.

Seat lost to a Republican incumbent 
: Leo C. Zeferetti lost a redistricting race to Guy V. Molinari.
: Peter A. Peyser lost a redistricting race to Benjamin A. Gilman.

Seat lost to a Republican challenger 
: Bob Shamansky lost to John Kasich.

Republicans 
Twenty-six incumbent Republicans lost re-election; five loss to Democratic incumbents while twenty-one loss to non-incumbent challengers, ten of whom were first elected in 1980.

Seat lost to a Democratic incumbent 
: John H. Rousselot lost a redistricting race to Matthew G. Martinez.
: Margaret Heckler lost a redistricting race to Barney Frank.
: Wendell Bailey lost a redistricting race to Ike Skelton.
: John LeBoutillier lost a redistricting race to Robert J. Mrazek.
: Clint Roberts lost a redistricting race to Tom Daschle.

Seat lost to a Democratic challenger 
: Albert L. Smith Jr. lost to Ben Erdreich.
: Donald H. Clausen lost to Douglas H. Bosco.
: Lawrence J. DeNardis lost to Bruce A. Morrison.
: Tom Evans lost to Thomas R. Carper.
: Paul Findley lost to Dick Durbin.
: H. Joel Deckard lost to Frank McCloskey.
: James Whitney Dunn lost to Milton Robert Carr.
: Tom Hagedorn lost to Tim Penny.
: Arlen Erdahl lost to Gerry Sikorski.
: Harold C. Hollenbeck lost to Robert Torricelli.
: Walter E. Johnston, III lost to Charles Robin Britt.
: Bill Hendon lost to James M. Clarke.
: Ed Weber lost to Marcy Kaptur.
: Charles F. Dougherty lost to Robert A. Borski, Jr..
: Eugene Atkinson lost to Joseph P. Kolter.
: James K. Coyne, III lost to Peter H. Kostmayer.
: James L. Nelligan lost to Frank Harrison.
: John Light Napier lost to Robin Tallon.
: Robert Daniel lost to Norman Sisisky.
: William C. Wampler lost to Rick Boucher.
: Mick Staton lost to Bob Wise.

Special elections 

|-
! 
| William Cotter
|  | Democratic
| 1970
|  | Incumbent died September 8, 1981.New member elected January 11, 1982.Democratic hold.Winner was subsequently re-elected in November.
| nowrap | 

|-
! 
| John M. Ashbrook
|  | Republican
| 1960
|  | Incumbent died April 24, 1982.New member elected June 19, 1982.Republican hold.Winner did not seek re-election in November.
| nowrap | 

|-
! 
| George Danielson
|  | Democratic
| 1970
|  | Incumbent resigned March 9, 1982 to become Associate Justice of the California Court of Appeals.New member elected July 13, 1982.Democratic hold.Winner was subsequently re-elected in November.
| nowrap | 

|-
! 
| Adam Benjamin Jr.
|  | Democratic
| 1976
|  | Incumbent died September 7, 1982.New member elected November 2, 1982.Democratic hold.Successor was also elected the same day to the next term, see below.
| nowrap | 

|}

Alabama

|-
! 
| Jack Edwards
|  | Republican
| 1964
| Incumbent re-elected.
| nowrap | 

|-
! 
| William Louis Dickinson
|  | Republican
| 1964
| Incumbent re-elected.
| nowrap | 

|-
! 
| William Flynt Nichols
|  | Democratic
| 1966
| Incumbent re-elected.
| nowrap | 

|-
! 
| Tom Bevill
|  | Democratic
| 1966
| Incumbent re-elected.
| nowrap | 

|-
! 
| Ronnie Flippo
|  | Democratic
| 1976
| Incumbent re-elected.
| nowrap | 

|-
! 
| Albert L. Smith Jr.
|  | Republican
| 1980
|  | Incumbent lost re-election.New member elected.Democratic gain.
| nowrap | 

|-
! 
| Richard Shelby
|  | Democratic
| 1978
| Incumbent re-elected.
| nowrap | 

|}

Alaska

|-
! 
| Don Young
|  | Republican
| 1973 
| Incumbent re-elected.
| 

|}

Arizona

|-
! 
| John Jacob Rhodes
|  | Republican
| 1952
|  | Incumbent retired.New member elected.Republican hold.
| nowrap | 

|-
! 
| Mo Udall
|  | Democratic
| 1961 
| Incumbent re-elected.
| nowrap | 

|-
! 
| Bob Stump
|  | Democratic
| 1976
|  | Incumbent re-electedas a Republican.Republican gain.
| nowrap | 

|-
! 
| Eldon Rudd
|  | Republican
| 1976
| Incumbent re-elected.
| nowrap | 

|-
! 
| colspan=3  | None (district created)
|  | New seat.New member elected.Democratic gain.
| nowrap | 

|}

Arkansas

|-
! 
| William Vollie Alexander Jr.
|  | Democratic
| 1968
| Incumbent re-elected.
| nowrap | 

|-
! 
| Ed Bethune
|  | Republican
| 1978
| Incumbent re-elected.
| nowrap | 

|-
! 
| John Paul Hammerschmidt
|  | Republican
| 1966
| Incumbent re-elected.
| nowrap | 

|-
! 
| Beryl Anthony Jr.
|  | Democratic
| 1978
| Incumbent re-elected.
| nowrap | 

|}

California

The delegation increased from 43 to 45 seats.  To create the two-seat net gain, five seats with no incumbent were added (the 

|-
! 
| Donald H. Clausen
|  | Republican
| 1963 
|  | Incumbent lost re-election.New member elected.Democratic gain.
| nowrap | 

|-
! 
| Eugene A. Chappie
|  | Republican
| 1980
| Incumbent re-elected.
| nowrap | 

|-
! 
| Bob Matsui
|  | Democratic
| 1978
| Incumbent re-elected.
| nowrap | 

|-
! 
| Vic Fazio
|  | Democratic
| 1978
| Incumbent re-elected.
| nowrap | 

|-
! 
| Phillip Burton
|  | Democratic
| 1964
| Incumbent re-elected.
| nowrap | 

|-
! 
| John L. Burton
|  | Democratic
| 1974
|  | Incumbent retired.New member elected.Democratic hold.
| nowrap | 

|-
! 
| George Miller
|  | Democratic
| 1974
| Incumbent re-elected.
| nowrap | 

|-
! 
| Ron Dellums
|  | Democratic
| 1970
| Incumbent re-elected.
| nowrap | 

|-
! 
| Pete Stark
|  | Democratic
| 1972
| Incumbent re-elected.
| nowrap | 

|-
! 
| Don Edwards
|  | Democratic
| 1962
| Incumbent re-elected.
| nowrap | 

|-
! 
| Tom Lantos
|  | Democratic
| 1980
| Incumbent re-elected.
| nowrap | 

|-
! 
| Pete McCloskey
|  | Republican
| 1967 
|  | Incumbent retired to run for U.S. senator.New member elected.Republican hold.
| nowrap | 

|-
! 
| Norman Mineta
|  | Democratic
| 1974
| Incumbent re-elected.
| nowrap | 

|-
! 
| Norman D. Shumway
|  | Republican
| 1978
| Incumbent re-elected.
| nowrap | 

|-
! 
| Tony Coelho
|  | Democratic
| 1978
| Incumbent re-elected.
| nowrap | 

|-
! 
| Leon Panetta
|  | Democratic
| 1976
| Incumbent re-elected.
| nowrap | 

|-
! 
| Chip Pashayan
|  | Republican
| 1978
| Incumbent re-elected.
| nowrap | 

|-
! 
| colspan=3  | None (district created)
|  | New seat.New member elected.Democratic gain.
| nowrap | 

|-
! 
| Robert J. Lagomarsino
|  | Republican
| 1974
| Incumbent re-elected.
| nowrap | 

|-
! 
| Bill Thomas
|  | Republican
| 1978
| Incumbent re-elected.
| nowrap | 

|-
! rowspan=2 | 
| Bobbi Fiedler
|  | Republican
| 1980
| Incumbent re-elected.
| rowspan=2 nowrap | 

|-
| Barry Goldwater Jr.
|  | Republican
| 1969 
|  | Incumbent retired to run for U.S. senator.Republican loss.

|-
! 
| Carlos Moorhead
|  | Republican
| 1972
| Incumbent re-elected.
| nowrap | 

|-
! 
| Anthony Beilenson
|  | Democratic
| 1976
| Incumbent re-elected.
| nowrap | 

|-
! 
| Henry Waxman
|  | Democratic
| 1974
| Incumbent re-elected.
| nowrap | 

|-
! 
| Edward R. Roybal
|  | Democratic
| 1962
| Incumbent re-elected.
| nowrap | 

|-
! 
| colspan=3  | None (district created)
|  | New district.New member elected.Democratic gain.
| nowrap | 

|-
! 
| Bob Dornan
|  | Republican
| 1976
|  | Incumbent retired to run for U.S. senator.New member elected.Democratic gain.
| nowrap | 

|-
! 
| Julian Dixon
|  | Democratic
| 1978
| Incumbent re-elected.
| nowrap | 

|-
! 
| Augustus Hawkins
|  | Democratic
| 1962
| Incumbent re-elected.
| nowrap | 

|-
! rowspan=2 | 
| Matthew G. Martínez
|  | Democratic
| 1982
| Incumbent re-elected.
| rowspan=2 nowrap | 

|-
| John H. Rousselot
|  | Republican
| 19601962 1970 
|  | Incumbent lost re-election.Republican loss.

|-
! 
| Mervyn Dymally
|  | Democratic
| 1980
| Incumbent re-elected.
| nowrap | 

|-
! 
| Glenn M. Anderson
|  | Democratic
| 1968
| Incumbent re-elected.
| nowrap | 

|-
! rowspan=2 | 
| Wayne R. Grisham
|  | Republican
| 1978
|  | Incumbent lost renomination.Republican loss.
| rowspan=2 nowrap | 
|-
| David Dreier
|  | Republican
| 1980
| Incumbent re-elected.

|-
! 
| colspan=3  | None (district created)
|  | New seat.New member elected.Democratic gain.
| nowrap | 

|-
! 
| Jerry Lewis
|  | Republican
| 1978
| Incumbent re-elected.
| nowrap | 

|-
! 
| George Brown Jr.
|  | Democratic
| 19621970 1972
| Incumbent re-elected.
| nowrap | 

|-
! 
| colspan=3  | None (district created)
|  | New seat.New member elected.Republican gain.
| nowrap | 

|-
! 
| Jerry M. Patterson
|  | Democratic
| 1974
| Incumbent re-elected.
| nowrap | 

|-
! 
| William E. Dannemeyer
|  | Republican
| 1978
| Incumbent re-elected.
| nowrap | 

|-
! 
| Robert Badham
|  | Republican
| 1976
| Incumbent re-elected.
| nowrap | 

|-
! 
| Bill Lowery
|  | Republican
| 1980
| Incumbent re-elected.
| nowrap | 

|-
! 
| Dan Lungren
|  | Republican
| 1978
| Incumbent re-elected.
| nowrap | 

|-
! 
| Clair Burgener
|  | Republican
| 1972
|  | Incumbent retired.New member elected.Republican hold.
| nowrap | 

|-
! 
| colspan=3  | None (district created)
|  | New seat.New member elected.Democratic gain.
| nowrap | 

|-
! 
| Duncan L. Hunter
|  | Republican
| 1980
| Incumbent re-elected.
| nowrap | 

|}

Colorado

Colorado added a sixth seat in reapportionment, adding the new district near Denver.

|-
! 
| Patricia Schroeder
|  | Democratic
| 1972
| Incumbent re-elected.
| nowrap | 

|-
! 
| Tim Wirth
|  | Democratic
| 1974
| Incumbent re-elected.
| nowrap | 

|-
! 
| Raymond P. Kogovsek
|  | Democratic
| 1978
| Incumbent re-elected.
| nowrap | 

|-
! 
| Hank Brown
|  | Republican
| 1980
| Incumbent re-elected.
| nowrap | 

|-
! 
| Ken Kramer
|  | Republican
| 1978
| Incumbent re-elected.
| nowrap | 

|-
! 
| colspan=3  | None (district created)
|  | New seat.New member elected.Republican gain.
| nowrap | 

|}

Connecticut

|-
! 
| Barbara B. Kennelly
|  | Democratic
| 1982
| Incumbent re-elected.
| nowrap | 

|-
! 
| Sam Gejdenson
|  | Democratic
| 1980
| Incumbent re-elected.
| nowrap | 

|-
! 
| Lawrence J. DeNardis
|  | Republican
| 1980
|  | Incumbent lost re-election.New member elected.Democratic gain.
| nowrap | 

|-
! 
| Stewart McKinney
|  | Republican
| 1970
| Incumbent re-elected.
| nowrap | 

|-
! 
| William R. Ratchford
|  | Democratic
| 1978
| Incumbent re-elected.
| nowrap | 

|-
! 
| Toby Moffett
|  | Democratic
| 1974
|  | Incumbent retired to run for U.S. Senator.New member elected.Republican gain.
| nowrap | 

|}

Delaware

|-
! 
| Tom Evans
|  | Republican
| 1976
|  | Incumbent lost re-election.New member elected.Democratic gain.
| nowrap | 

|}

Florida

Florida added 4 new districts, going from 15 to 19 seats, adding a new district near Miami and 3 more in central and southwestern Florida.

|-
! 
| Earl Hutto
|  | Democratic
| 1978
| Incumbent re-elected.
| nowrap | 

|-
! 
| Don Fuqua
|  | Democratic
| 1962
| Incumbent re-elected.
| nowrap | 

|-
! 
| Charles Edward Bennett
|  | Democratic
| 1948
| Incumbent re-elected.
| nowrap | 

|-
! 
| Bill Chappell
|  | Democratic
| 1968
| Incumbent re-elected.
| nowrap | 

|-
! 
| Bill McCollum
|  | Republican
| 1980
| Incumbent re-elected.
| nowrap | 

|-
! 
| colspan=3  | None (district created)
|  | New seat.New member elected.Democratic gain.
| nowrap | 

|-
! 
| Sam M. Gibbons
|  | Democratic
| 1962
| Incumbent re-elected.
| nowrap | 

|-
! 
| Bill Young
|  | Republican
| 1970
| Incumbent re-elected.
| nowrap | 

|-
! 
| colspan=3  | None (district created)
|  | New seat.New member elected.Republican gain.
| nowrap | 

|-
! 
| Andy Ireland
|  | Democratic
| 1976
| Incumbent re-elected.
| nowrap | 

|-
! 
| Bill Nelson
|  | Democratic
| 1978
| Incumbent re-elected.
| nowrap | 

|-
! 
| Skip Bafalis
|  | Republican
| 1972
|  | Incumbent retired to run for Governor of Florida.New member elected.Republican hold.
| nowrap | 

|-
! 
| colspan=3  | None (district created)
|  | New seat.New member elected.Republican gain.
| nowrap | 

|-
! 
| Dan Mica
|  | Democratic
| 1978
| Incumbent re-elected.
| nowrap | 

|-
! 
| Clay Shaw
|  | Republican
| 1980
| Incumbent re-elected.
| nowrap | 

|-
! 
| colspan=3  | None (district created)
|  | New seat.New member elected.Democratic gain.
| nowrap | 

|-
! 
| William Lehman
|  | Democratic
| 1972
| Incumbent re-elected.
| nowrap | 

|-
! 
| Claude Pepper
|  | Democratic
| 1962
| Incumbent re-elected.
| nowrap | 

|-
! 
| Dante Fascell
|  | Democratic
| 1954
| Incumbent re-elected.
| nowrap | 

|}

Georgia

|-
! 
| Ronald "Bo" Ginn
|  | Democratic
| 1972
|  | Incumbent retired to run for Governor of Georgia.New member elected.Democratic hold.
| nowrap | 

|-
! 
| Charles Floyd Hatcher
|  | Democratic
| 1980
| Incumbent re-elected.
| nowrap | 

|-
! 
| Jack Thomas Brinkley
|  | Democratic
| 1966
|  | Incumbent retired.New member elected.Democratic hold.
| nowrap | 

|-
! 
| Elliott H. Levitas
|  | Democratic
| 1974
| Incumbent re-elected.
| nowrap | 

|-
! 
| Wyche Fowler
|  | Democratic
| 1977 
| Incumbent re-elected.
| nowrap | 

|-
! 
| Newt Gingrich
|  | Republican
| 1978
| Incumbent re-elected.
| nowrap | 

|-
! 
| Larry McDonald
|  | Democratic
| 1974
| Incumbent re-elected.
| nowrap | 

|-
! 
| Billy Lee Evans
|  | Democratic
| 1976
|  | Incumbent lost renomination.New member elected.Democratic hold.
| nowrap | 

|-
! 
| Ed Jenkins
|  | Democratic
| 1976
| Incumbent re-elected.
| nowrap | 

|-
! 
| Doug Barnard Jr.
|  | Democratic
| 1976
| Incumbent re-elected.
| nowrap | 

|}

Hawaii

|-
! 
| Cecil Heftel
|  | Democratic
| 1976
| Incumbent re-elected.
| nowrap | 

|-
! 
| Daniel Akaka
|  | Democratic
| 1976
| Incumbent re-elected.
| nowrap | 

|}

Idaho

|-
! 
| Larry Craig
|  | Republican
| 1980
| Incumbent re-elected.
| nowrap | 

|-
! 
| George V. Hansen
|  | Republican
| 19641968 1974
| Incumbent re-elected.
| nowrap | 

|}

Illinois

Illinois lost two seats at reapportionment, removing two districts with Republican incumbents, and at the same time two other Republican incumbents lost re-election in altered districts. 

|-
! 
| Harold Washington
|  | Democratic
| 1980
| Incumbent re-elected.
| nowrap | 

|-
! 
| Gus Savage
|  | Democratic
| 1980
| Incumbent re-elected.
| nowrap | 

|-
! 
| Marty Russo
|  | Democratic
| 1974
| Incumbent re-elected.
| nowrap | 

|-
! rowspan=2 | 
| Ed Derwinski
|  | Republican
| 1958
|  | Incumbent lost renomination.Republican loss.
| rowspan=2 nowrap | 

|-
| George M. O'Brien
|  | Republican
| 1972
| Incumbent re-elected.

|-
! 
| John G. Fary
|  | Democratic
| 1975 
|  | Incumbent lost renomination.New member elected.Democratic hold.
| nowrap | 

|-
! 
| Henry Hyde
|  | Republican
| 1974
| Incumbent re-elected.
| nowrap | 

|-
! 
| Cardiss Collins
|  | Democratic
| 1973 
| Incumbent re-elected.
| nowrap | 

|-
! 
| Dan Rostenkowski
|  | Democratic
| 1958
| Incumbent re-elected.
| nowrap | 

|-
! 
| Sidney R. Yates
|  | Democratic
| 19481962 1964
| Incumbent re-elected.
| nowrap | 

|-
! rowspan=2 | 
| John E. Porter
|  | Republican
| 1980
| Incumbent re-elected.
| rowspan=2 | 

|-
| Robert McClory
|  | Republican
| 1962
|  | Incumbent retired.Republican loss.

|-
! 
| Frank Annunzio
|  | Democratic
| 1964
| Incumbent re-elected.
| nowrap | 

|-
! 
| Phil Crane
|  | Republican
| 1969 
| Incumbent re-elected.
| nowrap | 

|-
! 
| John N. Erlenborn
|  | Republican
| 1964
| Incumbent re-elected.
| nowrap | 

|-
! 
| Tom Corcoran
|  | Republican
| 1976
| Incumbent re-elected.
| nowrap | 

|-
! 
| Edward Rell Madigan
|  | Republican
| 1972
| Incumbent re-elected.
| nowrap | 

|-
! 
| Lynn Morley Martin
|  | Republican
| 1980
| Incumbent re-elected.
| nowrap | 

|-
! 
| Tom Railsback
|  | Republican
| 1966
|  | Incumbent lost renomination.New member elected.Democratic gain.
| nowrap | 

|-
! 
| Robert H. Michel
|  | Republican
| 1956
| Incumbent re-elected.
| nowrap | 

|-
! 
| Dan Crane
|  | Republican
| 1978
| Incumbent re-elected.
| nowrap | 

|-
! 
| Paul Findley
|  | Republican
| 1960
|  | Incumbent lost re-election.New member elected.Democratic gain.
| nowrap | 

|-
! 
| Melvin Price
|  | Democratic
| 1944
| Incumbent re-elected.
| nowrap | 

|-
! 
| Paul Simon
|  | Democratic
| 1974
| Incumbent re-elected.
| nowrap | 

|}

Indiana

Indiana lost one seat at reapportionment; Republicans in the legislature deleted two Democratic districts and added a new Republican district, although this strategy was offset by the unexpected defeat of incumbent H. Joel Deckard.

|-
! 
| Adam Benjamin Jr.
|  | Democratic
| 1976
|  | Incumbent died.New member elected.Democratic hold.
| nowrap | 

|-
! 
| Philip R. Sharp
|  | Democratic
| 1974
| Incumbent re-elected.
| nowrap | 

|-
! 
| John P. Hiler
|  | Republican
| 1980
| Incumbent re-elected.
| nowrap | 

|-
! 
| Dan Coats
|  | Republican
| 1980
| Incumbent re-elected.
| nowrap | 

|-
! 
| Elwood Hillis
|  | Republican
| 1970
| Incumbent re-elected.
| nowrap | 

|-
! 
| colspan=3  | None (district created)
|  | New seat.New member elected.Republican gain.
| nowrap | 

|-
! rowspan=2 | 
| John T. Myers
|  | Republican
| 1966
| Incumbent re-elected.
| rowspan=2 nowrap | 

|-
| Floyd Fithian
|  | Democratic
| 1974
|  | Incumbent retired to run for U.S. Senator.Democratic loss.

|-
! 
| H. Joel Deckard
|  | Republican
| 1978
|  | Incumbent lost re-election.New member elected.Democratic gain.
| nowrap | 

|-
! 
| Lee H. Hamilton
|  | Democratic
| 1964
| Incumbent re-elected.
| nowrap | 

|-
! rowspan=2 | 
| Andrew Jacobs Jr.
|  | Democratic
| 19641972 1974
| Incumbent re-elected.
| rowspan=2 nowrap | 

|-
| David W. Evans
|  | Democratic
| 1974
|  | Incumbent lost renomination.Democratic loss.

|}

Iowa

|-
! 
| Jim Leach
|  | Republican
| 1976
| Incumbent re-elected.
| nowrap | 

|-
! 
| Tom Tauke
|  | Republican
| 1978
| Incumbent re-elected.
| nowrap | 

|-
! 
| T. Cooper Evans
|  | Republican
| 1980
| Incumbent re-elected.
| nowrap | 

|-
! 
| Neal Smith
|  | Democratic
| 1958
| Incumbent re-elected.
| nowrap | 

|-
! 
| Tom Harkin
|  | Democratic
| 1974
| Incumbent re-elected.
| nowrap | 

|-
! 
| Berkley Bedell
|  | Democratic
| 1974
| Incumbent re-elected.
| nowrap | 

|}

Kansas

|-
! 
| Pat Roberts
|  | Republican
| 1980
| Incumbent re-elected.
| nowrap | 

|-
! 
| James Edmund Jeffries
|  | Republican
| 1978
|  | Incumbent retired.New member elected.Democratic gain.
| nowrap | 

|-
! 
| Larry Winn
|  | Republican
| 1966
| Incumbent re-elected.
| nowrap | 

|-
! 
| Dan Glickman
|  | Democratic
| 1976
| Incumbent re-elected.
| nowrap | 

|-
! 
| Bob Whittaker
|  | Republican
| 1978
| Incumbent re-elected.
| nowrap | 

|}

Kentucky

|-
! 
| Carroll Hubbard
|  | Democratic
| 1974
| Incumbent re-elected.
| nowrap | 

|-
! 
| William Huston Natcher
|  | Democratic
| 1953 
| Incumbent re-elected.
| nowrap | 

|-
! 
| Romano L. Mazzoli
|  | Democratic
| 1970
| Incumbent re-elected.
| nowrap | 

|-
! 
| Gene Snyder
|  | Republican
| 19621964 1966
| Incumbent re-elected.
| nowrap | 

|-
! 
| Hal Rogers
|  | Republican
| 1980
| Incumbent re-elected.
| nowrap | 

|-
! 
| Larry J. Hopkins
|  | Republican
| 1978
| Incumbent re-elected.
| nowrap | 

|-
! 
| Carl D. Perkins
|  | Democratic
| 1948
| Incumbent re-elected.
| nowrap | 

|}

Louisiana

All eight incumbents were re-elected by receiving more than 50% of the vote in the September 11 non-partisan blanket primaries.

|-
! 
| Bob Livingston
|  | Republican
| 1977 
| Incumbent re-elected.
| nowrap | 

|-
! 
| Lindy Boggs
|  | Democratic
| 1973 
| Incumbent re-elected.
| nowrap | 

|-
! 
| Billy Tauzin
|  | Democratic
| 1980
| Incumbent re-elected.
| nowrap | 

|-
! 
| Buddy Roemer
|  | Democratic
| 1980
| Incumbent re-elected.
| nowrap | 

|-
! 
| Jerry Huckaby
|  | Democratic
| 1976
| Incumbent re-elected.
| nowrap | 

|-
! 
| Henson Moore
|  | Republican
| 1974
| Incumbent re-elected.
| nowrap | 

|-
! 
| John Breaux
|  | Democratic
| 1972
| Incumbent re-elected.
| nowrap | 

|-
! 
| Gillis William Long
|  | Democratic
| 19621964 1972
| Re-elected in primary
| nowrap | 

|}

Maine

|-
! 
| David F. Emery
|  | Republican
| 1974
|  | Incumbent retired to run for U.S. Senator.New member elected.Republican hold.
| nowrap | 

|-
! 
| Olympia Snowe
|  | Republican
| 1978
| Incumbent re-elected.
| nowrap | 

|}

Maryland

|-
! 
| Roy Dyson
|  | Democratic
| 1980
| Incumbent re-elected.
| nowrap | 

|-
! 
| Clarence Long
|  | Democratic
| 1962
| Incumbent re-elected.
| nowrap | 

|-
! 
| Barbara Mikulski
|  | Democratic
| 1976
| Incumbent re-elected.
| nowrap | 

|-
! 
| Marjorie Holt
|  | Republican
| 1972
| Incumbent re-elected.
| nowrap | 

|-
! 
| Steny Hoyer
|  | Democratic
| 1981 
| Incumbent re-elected.
| nowrap | 

|-
! 
| Beverly Byron
|  | Democratic
| 1978
| Incumbent re-elected.
| nowrap | 

|-
! 
| Parren Mitchell
|  | Democratic
| 1970
| Incumbent re-elected.
| nowrap | 

|-
! 
| Michael D. Barnes
|  | Democratic
| 1978
| Incumbent re-elected.
| nowrap | 

|}

Massachusetts

Massachusetts lost one seat at reapportionment, combining the districts of Barney Frank and Margaret Heckler.

|-
! 
| Silvio Conte
|  | Republican
| 1958
| Incumbent re-elected.
| nowrap | 

|-
! 
| Edward Boland
|  | Democratic
| 1952
| Incumbent re-elected.
| nowrap | 

|-
! 
| Joseph D. Early
|  | Democratic
| 1974
| Incumbent re-elected.
| nowrap | 

|-
! rowspan=2 | 
| Barney Frank
|  | Democratic
| 1980
| Incumbent re-elected.
| rowspan=2 nowrap | 

|-
| Margaret Heckler
|  | Republican
| 1966
|  | Incumbent lost re-election.Republican loss.

|-
! 
| James Shannon
|  | Democratic
| 1978
| Incumbent re-elected.
| nowrap | 

|-
! 
| Nicholas Mavroules
|  | Democratic
| 1978
| Incumbent re-elected.
| nowrap | 

|-
! 
| Ed Markey
|  | Democratic
| 1976
| Incumbent re-elected.
| nowrap | 

|-
! 
| Tip O'Neill
|  | Democratic
| 1952
| Incumbent re-elected.
| nowrap | 

|-
! 
| Joe Moakley
|  | Democratic
| 1972
| Incumbent re-elected.
| nowrap | 

|-
! 
| Gerry E. Studds
|  | Democratic
| 1972
| Incumbent re-elected.
| nowrap | 

|-
! 
| Brian J. Donnelly
|  | Democratic
| 1978
| Incumbent re-elected.
| nowrap | 

|}

Michigan

Michigan lost one seat at reapportionment.

|-
! 
| John Conyers Jr.
|  | Democratic
| 1964
| Incumbent re-elected.
| nowrap | 

|-
! 
| Carl Pursell
|  | Republican
| 1976
| Incumbent re-elected.
| nowrap | 

|-
! 
| Howard Wolpe
|  | Democratic
| 1978
| Incumbent re-elected.
| nowrap | 

|-
! 
| Mark D. Siljander
|  | Republican
| 1981 
| Incumbent re-elected.
| nowrap | 

|-
! 
| Harold S. Sawyer
|  | Republican
| 1976
| Incumbent re-elected.
| nowrap | 

|-
! 
| James Whitney Dunn
|  | Republican
| 1980
|  | Incumbent lost re-election.New member elected.Democratic gain.
| nowrap | 

|-
! 
| Dale E. Kildee
|  | Democratic
| 1976
| Incumbent re-elected.
| nowrap | 

|-
! 
| J. Bob Traxler
|  | Democratic
| 1974
| Incumbent re-elected.
| nowrap | 

|-
! 
| Guy Vander Jagt
|  | Republican
| 1966
| Incumbent re-elected.
| nowrap | 

|-
! 
| Donald J. Albosta
|  | Democratic
| 1978
| Incumbent re-elected.
| nowrap | 

|-
! 
| Robert William Davis
|  | Republican
| 1978
| Incumbent re-elected.
| nowrap | 

|-
! 
| David Bonior
|  | Democratic
| 1976
| Incumbent re-elected.
| nowrap | 

|-
! 
| George Crockett Jr.
|  | Democratic
| 1980
| Incumbent re-elected.
| nowrap | 

|-
! 
| Dennis M. Hertel
|  | Democratic
| 1980
| Incumbent re-elected.
| nowrap | 

|-
! 
| William D. Ford
|  | Democratic
| 1964
| Incumbent re-elected.
| nowrap | 

|-
! 
| John D. Dingell Jr.
|  | Democratic
| 1955 
| Incumbent re-elected.
| nowrap | 

|-
! rowspan=2 | 
| William M. Brodhead
|  | Democratic
| 1974
|  | Incumbent retired.New member elected.Democratic hold.
| rowspan=2 nowrap | 

|-
| James J. Blanchard
|  | Democratic
| 1974
|  | Incumbent retired to run for Governor of Michigan.Democratic loss.

|-
! 
| William Broomfield
|  | Republican
| 1956
| Incumbent re-elected.
| nowrap | 

|}

Minnesota

|-
! 
| Tom Hagedorn
|  | Republican
| 1974
|  | Incumbent lost re-election.New member elected.Democratic gain.
| nowrap | 

|-
! 
| Vin Weber
|  | Republican
| 1980
| Incumbent re-elected.
| nowrap | 

|-
! 
| Bill Frenzel
|  | Republican
| 1970
| Incumbent re-elected.
| nowrap | 

|-
! 
| Bruce Vento
|  | Democratic
| 1976
| Incumbent re-elected.
| nowrap | 

|-
! 
| Martin Olav Sabo
|  | Democratic
| 1978
| Incumbent re-elected.
| nowrap | 

|-
! 
| Arlen Erdahl
|  | Republican
| 1978
|  | Incumbent lost re-election.New member elected.Democratic gain.
| nowrap | 

|-
! 
| Arlan Stangeland
|  | Republican
| 1977 
| Incumbent re-elected.
| nowrap | 

|-
! 
| Jim Oberstar
|  | Democratic
| 1974
| Incumbent re-elected.
| nowrap | 

|}

Mississippi

|-
! 
| Jamie L. Whitten
|  | Democratic
| 1941 
| Incumbent re-elected.
| nowrap | 

|-
! 
| David R. Bowen
|  | Democratic
| 1972
|  | Incumbent retired.New member elected.Republican gain.
| nowrap | 

|-
! 
| Gillespie V. Montgomery
|  | Democratic
| 1966
| Incumbent re-elected.
| nowrap | 

|-
! 
| Wayne Dowdy
|  | Democratic
| 1981 
| Incumbent re-elected.
| nowrap | 

|-
! 
| Trent Lott
|  | Republican
| 1972
| Incumbent re-elected.
| nowrap | 

|}

Missouri

Missouri lost one seat at reapportionment.

|-
! 
| Bill Clay
|  | Democratic
| 1968
| Incumbent re-elected.
| nowrap | 

|-
! 
| Robert A. Young
|  | Democratic
| 1976
| Incumbent re-elected.
| nowrap | 

|-
! 
| Dick Gephardt
|  | Democratic
| 1976
| Incumbent re-elected.
| nowrap | 

|-
! rowspan=2 | 
| Ike Skelton
|  | Democratic
| 1976
| Incumbent re-elected.
| rowspan=2 nowrap | 

|-
| Wendell Bailey
|  | Republican
| 1980
|  | Incumbent lost re-election.Republican loss.

|-
! 
| Richard Bolling
|  | Democratic
| 1948
|  | Incumbent retired.New member elected.Democratic hold.
| nowrap | 

|-
! 
| Earl Thomas Coleman
|  | Republican
| 1976
| Incumbent re-elected.
| nowrap | 

|-
! 
| Gene Taylor
|  | Republican
| 1972
| Incumbent re-elected.
| nowrap | 

|-
! 
| Bill Emerson
|  | Republican
| 1980
| Incumbent re-elected.
| nowrap | 

|-
! 
| Harold Volkmer
|  | Democratic
| 1976
| Incumbent re-elected.
| nowrap | 

|}

Montana

|-
! 
| John Patrick Williams
|  | Democratic
| 1978
| Incumbent re-elected.
| nowrap | 

|-
! 
| Ron Marlenee
|  | Republican
| 1976
| Incumbent re-elected.
| nowrap | 

|}

Nebraska

|-
! 
| Doug Bereuter
|  | Republican
| 1978
| Incumbent re-elected.
| nowrap | 

|-
! 
| Hal Daub
|  | Republican
| 1980
| Incumbent re-elected.
| nowrap | 

|-
! 
| Virginia D. Smith
|  | Republican
| 1974
| Incumbent re-elected.
| nowrap | 

|}

Nevada

|-
! 
| colspan=3  | None (district created)
|  | New seat.New member elected.Democratic gain.
| nowrap | 

|-
! 
| James David Santini
|  | Democratic
| 1974
|  | Incumbent retired to run for U.S. Senator.New member elected.Republican gain.
| nowrap | 

|}

New Hampshire

|-
! 
| Norman D'Amours
|  | Democratic
| 1974
| Incumbent re-elected.
| nowrap | 

|-
! 
| Judd Gregg
|  | Republican
| 1980
| Incumbent re-elected.
| nowrap | 

|}

New Jersey

New Jersey lost one seat at reapportionment.

|-
! 
| James J. Florio
|  | Democratic
| 1974
| Incumbent re-elected.
| nowrap | 

|-
! 
| William J. Hughes
|  | Democratic
| 1974
| Incumbent re-elected.
| nowrap | 

|-
! 
| James J. Howard
|  | Democratic
| 1964
| Incumbent re-elected.
| nowrap | 

|-
! 
| Christopher H. Smith
|  | Republican
| 1980
| Incumbent re-elected.
| nowrap | 

|-
! 
| Marge Roukema
|  | Republican
| 1980
| Incumbent re-elected.
| nowrap | 

|-
! 
| Bernard J. Dwyer
|  | Democratic
| 1980
| Incumbent re-elected.
| nowrap | 

|-
! 
| Matthew John Rinaldo
|  | Republican
| 1972
| Incumbent re-elected.
| nowrap | 

|-
! 
| Robert A. Roe
|  | Democratic
| 1970
| Incumbent re-elected.
| nowrap | 

|-
! 
| Harold C. Hollenbeck
|  | Republican
| 1976
|  | Incumbent lost re-election.New member elected.Democratic gain.
| nowrap | 

|-
! 
| Peter W. Rodino
|  | Democratic
| 1948
| Incumbent re-elected.
| nowrap | 

|-
! 
| Joseph G. Minish
|  | Democratic
| 1962
| Incumbent re-elected.
| nowrap | 

|-
! rowspan=2 | 
| James A. Courter
|  | Republican
| 1978
| Incumbent re-elected.
| rowspan=2 nowrap | 

|-
| Millicent Fenwick
|  | Republican
| 1974
|  | Incumbent retired to run for U.S. Senator.Republican loss.

|-
! 
| Edwin B. Forsythe
|  | Republican
| 1970
| Incumbent re-elected.
| nowrap | 

|-
! 
| Frank Joseph Guarini
|  | Democratic
| 1978
| Incumbent re-elected.
| nowrap | 

|}

New Mexico

|-
! 
| Manuel Lujan Jr.
|  | Republican
| 1968
| Incumbent re-elected.
| nowrap | 

|-
! 
| Joe Skeen
|  | Republican
| 1980
| Incumbent re-elected.
| nowrap | 

|-
! 
| colspan=3  | None (district created)
|  | New seat.New member elected.Democratic gain.
| nowrap | 

|}

New York

New York lost five seats at reapportionment.

|-
! 
| William Carney
|  | Conservative
| 1978
| Incumbent re-elected.
| nowrap | 

|-
! 
| Thomas J. Downey
|  | Democratic
| 1974
| Incumbent re-elected.
| nowrap | 

|-
! rowspan=2 | 
| Gregory W. Carman
|  | Republican
| 1980
|  | Incumbent retired.Republican loss.
| rowspan=2 nowrap | 

|-
| John LeBoutillier
|  | Republican
| 1980
|  | Incumbent lost re-election.New member elected.Democratic gain.

|-
! 
| Norman F. Lent
|  | Republican
| 1970
| Incumbent re-elected.
| nowrap | 

|-
! 
| Raymond J. McGrath
|  | Republican
| 1980
| Incumbent re-elected.
| nowrap | 

|-
! 
| Joseph P. Addabbo
|  | Democratic
| 1960
| Incumbent re-elected.
| nowrap | 

|-
! 
| Benjamin Stanley Rosenthal
|  | Democratic
| 1962
| Incumbent re-elected.
| nowrap | 

|-
! 
| James H. Scheuer
|  | Democratic
| 19641972 1974
| Incumbent re-elected.
| nowrap | 

|-
! 
| Geraldine Ferraro
|  | Democratic
| 1978
| Incumbent re-elected.
| nowrap | 

|-
! 
| Chuck Schumer
|  | Democratic
| 1980
| Incumbent re-elected.
| nowrap | 

|-
! 
| Fred Richmond
|  | Democratic
| 1974
|  | ResignedDemocratic hold.
| nowrap | 

|-
! 
| Shirley Chisholm
|  | Democratic
| 1968
|  | Incumbent retired.New member elected.Democratic hold.
| nowrap | 

|-
! 
| Stephen J. Solarz
|  | Democratic
| 1974
| Incumbent re-elected.
| nowrap | 

|-
! rowspan=2 | 
| Guy V. Molinari
|  | Republican
| 1980
| Incumbent re-elected.
| rowspan=2 nowrap | 

|-
| Leo C. Zeferetti
|  | Democratic
| 1974
|  | Incumbent lost re-election.Democratic loss.

|-
! 
| S. William Green
|  | Republican
| 1978
| Incumbent re-elected.
| nowrap | 

|-
! 
| Charles B. Rangel
|  | Democratic
| 1970
| Incumbent re-elected.
| nowrap | 

|-
! rowspan=2 | 
| Theodore S. Weiss
|  | Democratic
| 1976
| Incumbent re-elected.
| rowspan=2 nowrap | 

|-
| Jonathan Brewster Bingham
|  | Democratic
| 1964
|  | Incumbent retired.Democratic loss.

|-
! 
| Robert García
|  | Democratic
| 1978
| Incumbent re-elected.
| nowrap | 

|-
! 
| Mario Biaggi
|  | Democratic
| 1968
| Incumbent re-elected.
| nowrap | 

|-
! 
| Richard Ottinger
|  | Democratic
| 19641970 1974
| Incumbent re-elected.
| nowrap | 

|-
! 
| Hamilton Fish IV
|  | Republican
| 1968
| Incumbent re-elected.
| nowrap | 

|-
! rowspan=2 | 
| Benjamin A. Gilman
|  | Republican
| 1972
| Incumbent re-elected.
| rowspan=2 nowrap | 

|-
| Peter A. Peyser
|  | Democratic
| 19701976 1978
|  | Incumbent lost re-election.Democratic loss.

|-
! 
| Samuel S. Stratton
|  | Democratic
| 1958
| Incumbent re-elected.
| nowrap | 

|-
! 
| Gerald B. H. Solomon
|  | Republican
| 1978
| Incumbent re-elected.
| nowrap | 

|-
! 
| Donald J. Mitchell
|  | Republican
| 1972
|  | Incumbent retired.New member elected.Republican hold.
| nowrap | 

|-
! 
| David O'Brien Martin
|  | Republican
| 1980
| Incumbent re-elected.
| nowrap | 

|-
! rowspan=2 | 
| George C. Wortley
|  | Republican
| 1980
| Incumbent re-elected.
| rowspan=2 nowrap | 

|-
| Gary A. Lee
|  | Republican
| 1978
|  | Incumbent lost renomination.Republican loss.

|-
! 
| Matthew F. McHugh
|  | Democratic
| 1974
| Incumbent re-elected.
| nowrap | 

|-
! 
| Frank Horton
|  | Republican
| 1962
| Incumbent re-elected.
| nowrap | 

|-
! 
| Barber Conable
|  | Republican
| 1964
| Incumbent re-elected.
| nowrap | 

|-
! 
| Jack Kemp
|  | Republican
| 1970
| Incumbent re-elected.
| nowrap | 

|-
! 
| John J. LaFalce
|  | Democratic
| 1974
| Incumbent re-elected.
| nowrap | 

|-
! 
| Henry J. Nowak
|  | Democratic
| 1974
| Incumbent re-elected.
| nowrap | 

|-
! 
| Stan Lundine
|  | Democratic
| 1976
| Incumbent re-elected.
| nowrap | 

|}

North Carolina

|-
! 
| Walter B. Jones Sr.
|  | Democratic
| 1966
| Incumbent re-elected.
| nowrap | 

|-
! 
| Lawrence H. Fountain
|  | Democratic
| 1952
|  | Incumbent retired.New member elected.Democratic hold.
| nowrap | 

|-
! 
| Charles Orville Whitley
|  | Democratic
| 1976
| Incumbent re-elected.
| nowrap | 

|-
! 
| Ike Franklin Andrews
|  | Democratic
| 1972
| Incumbent re-elected.
| nowrap | 

|-
! 
| Stephen L. Neal
|  | Democratic
| 1974
| Incumbent re-elected.
| nowrap | 

|-
! 
| Walter E. Johnston III
|  | Republican
| 1980
|  | Incumbent lost re-election.New member elected.Democratic gain.
| nowrap | 

|-
! 
| Charlie Rose
|  | Democratic
| 1972
| Incumbent re-elected.
| nowrap | 

|-
! 
| Bill Hefner
|  | Democratic
| 1974
| Incumbent re-elected.
| nowrap | 

|-
! 
| James G. Martin
|  | Republican
| 1972
| Incumbent re-elected.
| nowrap | 

|-
! 
| James T. Broyhill
|  | Republican
| 1962
| Incumbent re-elected.
| nowrap | 

|-
! 
| Bill Hendon
|  | Republican
| 1980
|  | Incumbent lost re-election.New member elected.Democratic gain.
| nowrap | 

|}

North Dakota

|-
! 
| Byron Dorgan
|  | Democratic
| 1980
| Incumbent re-elected.
| nowrap | 

|}

Ohio

Ohio lost two seats at reapportionment.

|-
! 
| Tom Luken
|  | Democratic
| 1974 1974 1976
| Incumbent re-elected.
| nowrap | 

|-
! 
| Bill Gradison
|  | Republican
| 1974
| Incumbent re-elected.
| nowrap | 

|-
! 
| Tony P. Hall
|  | Democratic
| 1978
| Incumbent re-elected.
| nowrap | 

|-
! 
| Mike Oxley
|  | Republican
| 1972
| Incumbent re-elected.
| nowrap | 

|-
! 
| Del Latta
|  | Republican
| 1958
| Incumbent re-elected.
| nowrap | 

|-
! 
| Bob McEwen
|  | Republican
| 1980
| Incumbent re-elected.
| nowrap | 

|-
! 
| Bud Brown
|  | Republican
| 1965
|  | Incumbent retired to run for Governor of Ohio.New member elected.Republican hold.
| nowrap | 

|-
! 
| Tom Kindness
|  | Republican
| 1974
| Incumbent re-elected.
| nowrap | 

|-
! 
| Ed Weber
|  | Republican
| 1980
|  | Incumbent lost re-election.New member elected.Democratic gain.
| nowrap | 

|-
! rowspan=2 | 
| Clarence E. Miller
|  | Republican
| 1966
| Incumbent re-elected.
| rowspan=2 nowrap | 

|-
| Jean Spencer Ashbrook
|  | Republican
| 1982
|  | Incumbent retired.Republican loss.

|-
! rowspan=2 | 
| J. William Stanton
|  | Republican
| 1964
|  | Incumbent retired.Republican loss.
| rowspan=2 nowrap | 

|-
| Dennis E. Eckart
|  | Democratic
| 1980
| Incumbent re-elected.

|-
! 
| Bob Shamansky
|  | Democratic
| 1980
|  | Incumbent lost re-election.New member elected.Republican gain.
| nowrap | 

|-
! 
| Don Pease
|  | Democratic
| 1976
| Incumbent re-elected.
| nowrap | 

|-
! 
| John F. Seiberling
|  | Democratic
| 1970
| Incumbent re-elected.
| nowrap | 

|-
! 
| Chalmers P. Wylie
|  | Republican
| 1966
| Incumbent re-elected.
| nowrap | 

|-
! 
| Ralph Regula
|  | Republican
| 1972
| Incumbent re-elected.
| nowrap | 

|-
! 
| Lyle Williams
|  | Republican
| 1978
| Incumbent re-elected.
| nowrap | 

|-
! 
| Douglas Applegate
|  | Democratic
| 1976
| Incumbent re-elected.
| nowrap | 

|-
! 
| Ronald M. Mottl
|  | Democratic
| 1974
|  | Incumbent lost renomination.New member elected.Democratic hold.
| nowrap | 

|-
! 
| Mary Rose Oakar
|  | Democratic
| 1976
| Incumbent re-elected.
| nowrap | 

|-
! 
| Louis Stokes
|  | Democratic
| 1968
| Incumbent re-elected.
| nowrap | 

|}

Oklahoma

|-
! 
| James R. Jones
|  | Democratic
| 1972
| Incumbent re-elected.
| nowrap | 

|-
! 
| Mike Synar
|  | Democratic
| 1978
| Incumbent re-elected.
| nowrap | 

|-
! 
| Wes Watkins
|  | Democratic
| 1976
| Incumbent re-elected.
| nowrap | 

|-
! 
| Dave McCurdy
|  | Democratic
| 1980
| Incumbent re-elected.
| nowrap | 

|-
! 
| Mickey Edwards
|  | Republican
| 1976
| Incumbent re-elected.
| nowrap | 

|-
! 
| Glenn English
|  | Democratic
| 1974
| Incumbent re-elected.
| nowrap | 

|}

Oregon

|-
! 
| Les AuCoin
|  | Democratic
| 1974
| Incumbent re-elected.
| nowrap | 

|-
! 
| colspan=3  | None (district created)
|  | New seat.New member elected.Republican gain.
| nowrap | 

|-
! 
| Ron Wyden
|  | Democratic
| 1980
| Incumbent re-elected.
| nowrap | 

|-
! 
| Jim Weaver
|  | Democratic
| 1974
| Incumbent re-elected.
| nowrap | 

|-
! 
| Denny Smith
|  | Republican
| 1980
| Incumbent re-elected.
| nowrap | 

|}

Pennsylvania

Pennsylvania lost two seats at reapportionment.

|-
! rowspan=2 | 
| Thomas M. Foglietta
|  | Democratic
| 1980
| Incumbent re-elected.
| rowspan=2 nowrap | 

|-
| Joseph F. Smith
|  | Democratic
| 1981 
|  | Incumbent lost renomination.Democratic loss.

|-
! 
| William H. Gray
|  | Democratic
| 1978
| Incumbent re-elected.
| nowrap | 

|-
! 
| Charles F. Dougherty
|  | Republican
| 1978
|  | Incumbent lost re-election.New member elected.Democratic gain.
| nowrap | 

|-
! 
| Eugene Atkinson
|  | Republican
| 1978
|  | Incumbent lost re-election.New member elected.Democratic gain.
| nowrap | 

|-
! 
| Richard T. Schulze
|  | Republican
| 1974
| Incumbent re-elected.
| nowrap | 

|-
! 
| Gus Yatron
|  | Democratic
| 1968
| Incumbent re-elected.
| nowrap | 

|-
! 
| Robert W. Edgar
|  | Democratic
| 1974
| Incumbent re-elected.
| nowrap | 

|-
! 
| James K. Coyne III
|  | Republican
| 1980
|  | Incumbent lost re-election.New member elected.Democratic gain.
| nowrap | 

|-
! 
| Bud Shuster
|  | Republican
| 1972
| Incumbent re-elected.
| nowrap | 

|-
! 
| Joseph M. McDade
|  | Republican
| 1962
| Incumbent re-elected.
| nowrap | 

|-
! 
| James L. Nelligan
|  | Republican
| 1980
|  | Incumbent lost re-election.New member elected.Democratic gain.
| nowrap | 

|-
! rowspan=2 | 
| John Murtha
|  | Democratic
| 1974
| Incumbent re-elected.
| rowspan=2 nowrap | 

|-
| Donald A. Bailey
|  | Democratic
| 1978
|  | Incumbent lost renomination.Democratic loss.

|-
! 
| R. Lawrence Coughlin
|  | Republican
| 1968
| Incumbent re-elected.
| nowrap | 

|-
! 
| William J. Coyne
|  | Democratic
| 1980
| Incumbent re-elected.
| nowrap | 

|-
! 
| Donald L. Ritter
|  | Republican
| 1978
| Incumbent re-elected.
| nowrap | 

|-
! 
| Robert Smith Walker
|  | Republican
| 1976
| Incumbent re-elected.
| nowrap | 

|-
! 
| Allen E. Ertel
|  | Democratic
| 1976
|  | Incumbent retired to run for Governor of Pennsylvania.New member elected.Republican gain.
| nowrap | 

|-
! 
| Doug Walgren
|  | Democratic
| 1976
| Incumbent re-elected.
| nowrap | 

|-
! 
| William F. Goodling
|  | Republican
| 1974
| Incumbent re-elected.
| nowrap | 

|-
! 
| Joseph M. Gaydos
|  | Democratic
| 1968
| Incumbent re-elected.
| nowrap | 

|-
! 
| Marc L. Marks
|  | Republican
| 1976
|  | Incumbent retired.New member elected.Republican hold.
| nowrap | 

|-
! 
| Austin Murphy
|  | Democratic
| 1976
| Incumbent re-elected.
| nowrap | 

|-
! 
| William F. Clinger Jr.
|  | Republican
| 1978
| Incumbent re-elected.
| nowrap | 

|}

Rhode Island

|-
! 
| Fernand St. Germain
|  | Democratic
| 1960
| Incumbent re-elected.
| nowrap | 

|-
! 
| Claudine Schneider
|  | Republican
| 1980
| Incumbent re-elected.
| nowrap | 

|}

South Carolina

|-
! 
| Thomas F. Hartnett
|  | Republican
| 1980
| Incumbent re-elected.
| nowrap | 

|-
! 
| Floyd Spence
|  | Republican
| 1970
| Incumbent re-elected.
| nowrap | 

|-
! 
| Butler Derrick
|  | Democratic
| 1974
| Incumbent re-elected.
| nowrap | 

|-
! 
| Carroll A. Campbell Jr.
|  | Republican
| 1978
| Incumbent re-elected.
| nowrap | 

|-
! 
| Kenneth Lamar Holland
|  | Democratic
| 1974
|  | Incumbent retired.New member elected.Democratic hold.
| nowrap | 

|-
! 
| John Light Napier
|  | Republican
| 1980
|  | Incumbent lost re-election.New member elected.Democratic gain.
| nowrap | 

|}

South Dakota

|-
! rowspan=2 | 
| Tom Daschle
|  | Democratic
| 1978
| Incumbent re-elected.
| rowspan=2 nowrap | 

|-
| Clint Roberts
|  | Republican
| 1980
|  | Incumbent lost re-election.Republican loss.

|}

Tennessee

|-
! 
| Jimmy Quillen
|  | Republican
| 1962
| Incumbent re-elected.
| nowrap | 

|-
! 
| John Duncan Sr.
|  | Republican
| 1964
| Incumbent re-elected.
| nowrap | 

|-
! 
| Marilyn Lloyd
|  | Democratic
| 1974
| Incumbent re-elected.
| nowrap | 

|-
! 
| colspan=3  | None (district created)
|  | New seat.New member elected.Democratic gain.
| nowrap | 

|-
! 
| Bill Boner
|  | Democratic
| 1978
| Incumbent re-elected.
| nowrap | 

|-
! 
| Al Gore
|  | Democratic
| 1976
| Incumbent re-elected.
| nowrap | 

|-
! 
| Robin Beard
|  | Republican
| 1972
|  | Incumbent retired to run for U.S. Senator.New member elected.Republican hold.
| nowrap | 

|-
! 
| Ed Jones
|  | Democratic
| 1969 
| Incumbent re-elected.
| nowrap | 

|-
! 
| Harold Ford Sr.
|  | Democratic
| 1974
| Incumbent re-elected.
| nowrap | 

|}

Texas

|-
! 
| Sam B. Hall Jr.
|  | Democratic
| 1976
| Incumbent re-elected.
| nowrap | 

|-
! 
| Charles Wilson
|  | Democratic
| 1972
| Incumbent re-elected.
| nowrap | 

|-
! 
| James M. Collins
|  | Republican
| 1968
|  | Incumbent retired to run for U.S. Senator.New member elected.Republican hold.
| nowrap | 

|-
! 
| Ralph Hall
|  | Democratic
| 1980
| Incumbent re-elected.
| nowrap | 

|-
! 
| Jim Mattox
|  | Democratic
| 1976
|  | Incumbent retired to run for Attorney GeneralDemocratic hold.
| nowrap | 

|-
! 
| Phil Gramm
|  | Democratic
| 1978
| Incumbent re-elected.
| nowrap | 

|-
! 
| William Reynolds Archer Jr.
|  | Republican
| 1970
| Incumbent re-elected.
| nowrap | 

|-
! 
| Jack Fields
|  | Republican
| 1980
| Incumbent re-elected.
| nowrap | 

|-
! 
| Jack Brooks
|  | Democratic
| 1952
| Incumbent re-elected.
| nowrap | 

|-
! 
| J. J. Pickle
|  | Democratic
| 1963 
| Incumbent re-elected.
| nowrap | 

|-
! 
| Marvin Leath
|  | Democratic
| 1978
| Incumbent re-elected.
| nowrap | 

|-
! 
| Jim Wright
|  | Democratic
| 1954
| Incumbent re-elected.
| nowrap | 

|-
! 
| Jack Hightower
|  | Democratic
| 1974
| Incumbent re-elected.
| nowrap | 

|-
! 
| William Neff Patman
|  | Democratic
| 1980
| Incumbent re-elected.
| nowrap | 

|-
! 
| Kika de la Garza
|  | Democratic
| 1964
| Incumbent re-elected.
| nowrap | 

|-
! 
| Richard Crawford White
|  | Democratic
| 1964
|  | Incumbent retired.New member elected.Democratic hold.
| nowrap | 

|-
! 
| Charles Stenholm
|  | Democratic
| 1978
| Incumbent re-elected.
| nowrap | 

|-
! 
| Mickey Leland
|  | Democratic
| 1978
| Incumbent re-elected.
| nowrap | 

|-
! 
| Kent Hance
|  | Democratic
| 1978
| Incumbent re-elected.
| nowrap | 

|-
! 
| Henry B. González
|  | Democratic
| 1961 
| Incumbent re-elected.
| nowrap | 

|-
! 
| Tom Loeffler
|  | Republican
| 1978
| Incumbent re-elected.
| nowrap | 

|-
! 
| Ron Paul
|  | Republican
| 1976 1976 1978
| Incumbent re-elected.
| nowrap | 

|-
! 
| Abraham Kazen
|  | Democratic
| 1966
| Incumbent re-elected.
| nowrap | 

|-
! 
| Martin Frost
|  | Democratic
| 1978
| Incumbent re-elected.
| nowrap | 

|-
! 
| colspan=3  | None (district created)
|  | New seat.New member elected.Democratic gain.
| nowrap | 

|-
! 
| colspan=3  | None (district created)
|  | New seat.New member elected.Democratic gain.
| nowrap | 

|-
! 
| colspan=3  | None (district created)
|  | New seat.New member elected.Democratic gain.
| nowrap | 

|}

Utah

|-
! 
| James V. Hansen
|  | Republican
| 1980
| Incumbent re-elected.
| nowrap | 

|-
! 
| David Daniel Marriott
|  | Republican
| 1976
| Incumbent re-elected.
| nowrap | 

|-
! 
| colspan=3  | None (district created)
|  | New seat.New member elected.Republican gain.
| nowrap | 

|}

Vermont

|-
! 
| Jim Jeffords
|  | Republican
| 1974
| Incumbent re-elected.
| nowrap | 

|}

Virginia

|-
! 
| Paul S. Trible Jr.
|  | Republican
| 1976
|  | Incumbent retired to run for U.S. Senator.New member elected.Republican hold.
| nowrap | 

|-
! 
| G. William Whitehurst
|  | Republican
| 1968
| Incumbent re-elected.
| nowrap | 

|-
! 
| Thomas J. Bliley Jr.
|  | Republican
| 1980
| Incumbent re-elected.
| nowrap | 

|-
! 
| Robert Daniel
|  | Republican
| 1972
|  | Incumbent lost re-election.New member elected.Democratic gain.
| nowrap | 

|-
! 
| Dan Daniel
|  | Democratic
| 1968
| Incumbent re-elected.
| nowrap | 

|-
! 
| M. Caldwell Butler
|  | Republican
| 1972
|  | Incumbent retired.New member elected.Democratic gain.
| nowrap | 

|-
! 
| J. Kenneth Robinson
|  | Republican
| 1970
| Incumbent re-elected.
| nowrap | 

|-
! 
| Stanford E. Parris
|  | Republican
| 19721974 1980
| Incumbent re-elected.
| nowrap | 

|-
! 
| William C. Wampler
|  | Republican
| 19521954 1966
|  | Incumbent lost re-election.New member elected.Democratic gain.
| nowrap | 

|-
! 
| Frank Wolf
|  | Republican
| 1980
| Incumbent re-elected.
| nowrap | 

|}

Washington

|-
! 
| Joel Pritchard
|  | Republican
| 1972
| Incumbent re-elected.
| nowrap | 

|-
! 
| Al Swift
|  | Democratic
| 1978
| Incumbent re-elected.
| nowrap | 

|-
! 
| Don Bonker
|  | Democratic
| 1974
| Incumbent re-elected.
| nowrap | 

|-
! 
| Sid Morrison
|  | Republican
| 1980
| Incumbent re-elected.
| nowrap | 

|-
! 
| Tom Foley
|  | Democratic
| 1964
| Incumbent re-elected.
| nowrap | 

|-
! 
| Norman D. Dicks
|  | Democratic
| 1976
| Incumbent re-elected.
| nowrap | 

|-
! 
| Mike Lowry
|  | Democratic
| 1978
| Incumbent re-elected.
| nowrap | 

|-
! 
| colspan=3  | None (district created)
|  | New seat.New member elected.Republican gain.
| nowrap | 

|}

West Virginia

|-
! 
| Bob Mollohan
|  | Democratic
| 19521956 1968
|  | Incumbent retired.New member elected.Democratic hold.
| nowrap | 

|-
! 
| Cleve Benedict
|  | Republican
| 1980
|  | Incumbent retired to run for U.S. Senator.New member elected.Democratic gain.
| nowrap | 

|-
! 
| Mick Staton
|  | Republican
| 1980
|  | Incumbent lost re-election.New member elected.Democratic gain.
| nowrap | 

|-
! 
| Nick Rahall
|  | Democratic
| 1976
| Incumbent re-elected.
| nowrap | 

|}

Wisconsin

|-
! 
| Les Aspin
|  | Democratic
| 1970
| Incumbent re-elected.
| nowrap | 

|-
! 
| Robert Kastenmeier
|  | Democratic
| 1958
| Incumbent re-elected.
| nowrap | 

|-
! 
| Steve Gunderson
|  | Republican
| 1980
| Incumbent re-elected.
| nowrap | 

|-
! 
| Clement Zablocki
|  | Democratic
| 1948
| Incumbent re-elected.
| nowrap | 

|-
! 
| Henry Reuss
|  | Democratic
| 1954
|  | Incumbent retired.New member elected.Democratic hold.
| nowrap | 

|-
! 
| Tom Petri
|  | Republican
| 1979 
| Incumbent re-elected.
| nowrap | 

|-
! 
| Dave Obey
|  | Democratic
| 1969 
| Incumbent re-elected.
| nowrap | 

|-
! 
| Toby Roth
|  | Republican
| 1978
| Incumbent re-elected.
| nowrap | 

|-
! 
| James Sensenbrenner
|  | Republican
| 1978
| Incumbent re-elected.
| nowrap | 

|}

Wyoming

|-
! 
| Dick Cheney
|  | Republican
| 1978
| Incumbent re-elected.
| nowrap | 

|}

See also
 1982 United States elections
 1982 United States gubernatorial elections
 1982 United States Senate elections
 97th United States Congress
 98th United States Congress

Notes

References